Editora Fundamento is a Brazilian book publisher located in Curitiba, Paraná.

The first book titles released by this publishing house were all literature for children and young adults. However, after some time of successful presence in the Brazilian publishing market Editora Fundamento began expanding into other areas of interest acquiring copyrights to both national and foreign works.

All titles in the Editora Fundamento catalog are published in Portuguese; many of which are translations from English and from other languages.

Some of the titles published 

Rangers: Ordem dos Arqueiros - John Flanagan
Brotherband - John Flanagan
Deltora Quest - Emily Rodda
As Chaves do Reino - Garth Nix
Amanhã - John Marsden
Querido Diário Otário - Jim Benton
A Menina Que Era Outra Vez - Sergio Klein
Spy Dog - Andrew Cope
Bilboquê, Que Bicho é Esse? - Sergio Klein
Uma Breve História do Mundo - Geoffrey Blainey
Uma Breve História do Século XX - Geoffrey Blainey
Goosebumps - Robert Lawrence Stine
Midnight in Peking - Paul French

See also 
 Companhia das Letras
 Editora Abril
 Editora Globo

References

External links 
Official site (in Portuguese)

Book publishing companies of Brazil
Companies based in Curitiba